John Schot (born February 7, 1984 in Tholen) is a Dutch footballer plays as a midfielder for amateurs VV Kloetinge.

Career
He made his debut in the Eredivisie for RBC Roosendaal on 8 August 2008 against FC Omniworld replacing Sasa Stojanovic as a substitute. He scored his first goal against RKC Waalwijk. He successively played also for HSV Hoek.

References

1984 births
Living people
Dutch footballers
RBC Roosendaal players
HSV Hoek players
Eerste Divisie players
People from Tholen
Association football midfielders
VV Kloetinge players
Footballers from Zeeland